The Delaware United States House election for 1792 was held on October 2, 1792.  The former Continental Congressman John Vining chose not to run for reelection and was followed by John Patten.

Results

Recount

References

Delaware
1792
1792 Delaware elections